Lycée Maurice Utrillo is a comprehensive (polyvalent) senior high school/sixth form college in Stains, Seine-Saint-Denis, France, in the Paris metropolitan area.

 it has 150 employees, including 100 teachers, and 1,200 students.

It opened in September 1990.

References

External links
 Lycée Maurice Utrillo 

Lycées in Seine-Saint-Denis
1990 establishments in France
Educational institutions established in 1990